Rasm Al-Abed or Rasm Elabed may refer to:
Rasm al-Abed, a Syrian town located in Aleppo Governorate
Rasm Elabed, a Syrian village located in Hama Governorate
Rasm Elabed, Idlib, a Syrian village located in Idlib Governorate